Amynodontidae ("defensive tooth") is a family of extinct perissodactyls related to true rhinoceroses. They are commonly portrayed as semiaquatic hippo-like rhinos but this description only fits members of the Metamynodontini; other groups of amynodonts like the cadurcodontines had more typical ungulate proportions and convergently evolved a tapir-like proboscis.

The Greek name of the family describes their tusks, derived from enlarged canine teeth. Odd-toed ungulates are herbivores, so these tusks would have been used either to deter or defend against predators (as suggested by the name) or perhaps in fights among males.

Their fossils have been found in North America, and Eurasia ranging in age from the Middle Eocene to the Early Oligocene, with a single genus (Cadurcotherium) surviving into the Late Oligocene in South Asia (Pakistan). The genus Metamynodon may have survived into the early Miocene.

Taxonomy

†Amynodontidae
Subfamily Amynodontinae
Tribe Cadurcodontini
Genus Cadurcodon
Genus Lushiamynodon
Genus Sharamynodon
Tribe Metamynodontini
Genus Gigantamynodon
Genus Metamynodon
Genus Paramynodon
Genus Zaisanamynodon
Tribe incertae sedis
Genus Amynodon
Subfamily incertae sedis
Genus Amynodontopsis
Genus Armania
Genus Cadurcotherium
Genus Caenolophus
Genus Hypsamynodon
Genus Megalamynodon
Genus Penetrigonias
Genus Procadurcodon
Genus Rostriamynodon
Genus Teilhardia

References

Prehistoric odd-toed ungulates
Miocene extinctions
Eocene first appearances
Prehistoric mammal families